Crown Mountain is a mountain located north of North Vancouver, British Columbia, in the North Shore Mountains (part of the Coast Mountains) and is visible from most of Vancouver and the vicinity. A rock formation known as The Camel sits just east of the main summit, and the mountain has west and north peaks. The mountain lies on the fringes of Lynn Headwaters Regional Park. 

Crown has a history of local hiking, rock climbing, and mountaineering activity. Access is usually from the Grouse Mountain ski area. It is considered a very challenging objective. The top requires scrambling with the risk of a deadly fall, and is not recommended for novices. The mountain has been the site of numerous search and rescue operations.

References

External links

"Hiking Crown Mountain". Outdoor Vancouver

Crown
North Shore Mountains
North Vancouver (district municipality)